The following lists events that happened during the 1770s in South Africa.

Events

1772
 13 January - The Prince Edward Islands are re-discovered by the French explorer Marc-Joseph Marion du Fresne, and named them Terre de l'Espérance (Marion) and Ile de la Caverne (Pr. Edward)

1778
 The Cape Colony boundary is extended to Buffels, Zak and Fish Rivers
 Hendrik Jacob Wikar and Robert Jacob Gordon meet Khoikhoi, Geisiqua and Tswana tribes along lower and middle Gariep which Gordon names Orange River in honour of the Netherlands Stadtholder
 6 February - France formally recognises the United States as a nation by signing a treaty of Friendship and Trade.  An undeclared war with Britain soon erupted
 27 July - French and British navies clash just off the coast of France
 30 December - Britain captures the port of St. Lucia in the Caribbean Sea 
 British forces capture Pondicherry in the Bay of Bengal from the French, later recaptured
 The Dutch port of St Eustatius in the West Indies became the world's busiest port handling the majority of supplies and arms bound for the United States

1779
 Xhosas clash with the settlers moving north, at the Fish River starting the first of nine Cape Frontier Wars over the next 100 years. Also known as Africa's 100 Years War.
 12 April - Spain joins with France and America in the war against Britain

Births
 17 August 1777 - Anna Maria Truter, botanical artist and wife of Sir John Barrow, 1st Baronet, is born in Cape Town

Deaths
 1771 - Ryk Tulbagh, Governor of the Cape dies

References

See Years in South Africa for list of References

History of South Africa